Crawford State Park is a state park in Crawford County, Kansas, United States, located  north of Girard.

The  park, resides on a  lake built by the Civilian Conservation Corps (CCC) in the 1930s. There are two recorded archaeological sites within the park's boundaries, including remnants of a 19th-century U.S. military outpost. An interpretive trail connects the park with the Kansas Department of Wildlife and Parks' Farlington Fish Hatchery, which was built shortly after the CCC completed construction of the lake.

Crawford State Park is known as a fishing destination for channel catfish, crappie, and striped bass. Boating and scuba diving are also popular in the park.

Located on the edge of the Ozarks, Crawford State Park features numerous redbud trees.

See also
 List of Kansas state parks
 List of lakes, reservoirs, and dams in Kansas
 List of rivers of Kansas

References

External links

State parks of Kansas
State parks of the U.S. Interior Highlands
Civilian Conservation Corps in Kansas
Protected areas of Crawford County, Kansas